Inimai Idho Idho is a 1983 Indian Tamil-language film directed by R. Ramalingam, starring Chandrasekhar, Nisha Noor, and Rajendra Prasad. It was released on 29 April 1983.

Plot 
Chandrasekar is a small-time rough thug who is wandering in the village, without a job. Nisha is an orphan girl, who is very mischievous, and carefree, also lives with her sister in the same village. But she is very good girl and looking for a life partner. She develops a soft spot for Sekar. Prasad comes to that village and proposes to Nisha. But Nisha says that Chandrasekar is her mama and he will kill him. But Prasad is very particular to marry her. She has been torn between two guys. The guy she loves and the guy who loves her. Whom she marries form the climax.

Cast 
Chandrasekhar
 Nisha Noor
Rajendra Prasad
Goundamani

Soundtrack 
The music was composed by Ilaiyaraaja.

Reception 
Jeyamanmadhan of Kalki said the film was proof that the director had a bright future ahead, and wished him the best.

References

External links 
 

1980 films
1980s Tamil-language films
1983 films
Films scored by Ilaiyaraaja